Božidar Jović (born 13 February 1972) is a retired Croatian handball player.

He played for the Croatia men's national handball team at the 1996 Summer Olympics in Atlanta, where Croatia won the gold medal. He also won a gold medal at the World handball championship held in Portugal in 2003.

Honours
Borac Banja Luka
EHF Cup (1): 1991

RK Zagreb
Croatian First League (9): 1991-92, 1992–93, 1993–94, 1994–95, 1995–96, 1996–97, 1997–98, 1998–99, 1999-00
Croatian Cup (9): 1992, 1993, 1994, 1995, 1996, 1997, 1998, 1999, 2000
European Champions Cup (2): 1991-92, 1992–93

Veszprém
Hungarian First League (3): 2000-01, 2001-2002, 2002-2003
Magyar Kupa (2): 2002, 2003

Orders
Order of Danica Hrvatska with face of Franjo Bučar

References

External links
 
 
 
 

1972 births
Living people
Croatian male handball players
Olympic handball players of Croatia
Handball players at the 1996 Summer Olympics
Olympic gold medalists for Croatia
Olympic medalists in handball
RK Zagreb players
RK Zamet players
Medalists at the 1996 Summer Olympics
Mediterranean Games gold medalists for Croatia
Competitors at the 1997 Mediterranean Games
Competitors at the 2001 Mediterranean Games
Mediterranean Games medalists in handball
Sportspeople from Banja Luka
Croats of Bosnia and Herzegovina
20th-century Croatian people
21st-century Croatian people